The 1954 Detroit Red Wings prison game was an exhibition ice hockey game played on February 2, 1954. The exhibition was played outdoors at the Marquette Branch Prison between the Detroit Red Wings of the National Hockey League (NHL) and a team put together by the inmates of the prison. It was the first ever outdoor game played by the Detroit Red Wings and by any NHL team. After the first period the Red Wings were winning 18–0, and the scores for the remainder of the match were not kept. Newspaper accounts of the game from the Associated Press stated that the final score was 5–2.

The original planning for the game began in June 1953 when the general manager for the Red Wings, Jack Adams, visited the prison while doing a promotional tour for Stroh’s beer. There, the warden asked Adams if the Red Wings would come play the prison. Adams agreed, but only because he never expected the game to ever actually happen. Some say that Adams also agreed as a favor to two inmates he knew, Harry Keywell and Ray Bernstein, who were both members of the notorious Purple Gang.

The Pirates had a 4–1–1 record against outside opponents going into the game. The team was formed under the direction of prison athletic director Leonard Brumm after the Red Wings had visited the prison the previous year. The team was "impressed with the inmates' knowledge of hockey". The Pirates received equipment donations from the Michigan Tech Huskies and the Marquette Sentinels to start their hockey program.

References

Further reading
 The Day the Pros Faced Off with the Cons: Marquette's Most Infamous Hockey Game

1953–54 NHL season
Detroit Red Wings games
NHL outdoor games
February 1954 sports events in the United States
Detroit Red Wings prison